Events in the year 1996 in Burkina Faso.

Incumbents 

 President: Blaise Compaoré
 Prime Minister: Michel Kafando (until 6 February), Kadré Désiré Ouédraogo (from 6 February)

Events 

 February 5 – The Congress for Democracy and Progress (CDP) was founded.

Deaths

References 

 
1990s in Burkina Faso
Years of the 20th century in Burkina Faso
Burkina Faso
Burkina Faso